Nicolas Jackson (born 20 June 2001) is a professional footballer who plays as a forward for Spanish club Villarreal. Born in the Gambia, he represents the Senegal national team.

Club career
Jackson started his career with Casa Sports, being a part of the first team during the 2018–19 season. He was also named man of the match in a 1–1 draw against AS Pikine on 16 November 2018.

In September 2019, Jackson agreed to a contract with La Liga side Villarreal CF, being assigned to the Juvenil A squad. On 5 October of the following year, after finishing his formation, he was loaned to Segunda División side CD Mirandés for the 2020–21 season.

Jackson made his professional debut on 18 October 2020, coming on as a second-half substitute for Antonio Caballero in a 0–0 home draw against RCD Mallorca. He scored his first professional goal on 28 November, netting the opener in a 1–1 home draw against CD Castellón.

Upon returning, Jackson played for Villarreal's B-team in Primera División RFEF before making his first team – and La Liga – debut on 3 October 2021, replacing Arnaut Danjuma late into a 2–0 home win over Real Betis. He scored his first goal in the top tier on 13 August of the following year, netting the opener in a 3–0 away success over Real Valladolid.

On 26 August 2022, Jackson and teammate Álex Baena were promoted to the main squad. In January 2023, Villarreal agreed a £22.5 deal from AFC Bournemouth for the signing 
of Jackson but he failed his medical due to hamstring issues.

International career
Born in the Gambia, Jackson was raised in Senegal and is a dual citizen. He represented Senegal at under-20 level, receiving his first call-up in November 2018.

Career statistics

Club

International

References

External links
Profile at the Villarreal CF website

2001 births
Living people
Sportspeople from Banjul
Senegalese footballers
Senegal youth international footballers
Gambian footballers
Gambian emigrants to Senegal
Senegalese people of Gambian descent
Association football midfielders
Senegal Premier League players
Casa Sports players
La Liga players
Segunda División players
Primera Federación players
Villarreal CF B players
CD Mirandés footballers
Villarreal CF players
2022 FIFA World Cup players
Senegalese expatriate footballers
Senegalese expatriate sportspeople in Spain
Gambian expatriate footballers
Gambian expatriate sportspeople in Spain
Expatriate footballers in Spain